Juxtarctia is a genus of tiger moths in the family Erebidae. The genus is monotypic, containing only one species, Juxtarctia multiguttata described by Francis Walker in 1855, which is endemic for the Himalayas.

References
 , 2010: Tiger-moths of Eurasia (Lepidoptera, Arctiidae) (Nyctemerini by ). Neue Entomologische Nachrichten 65: 1–106, Marktleuthen.
 , 2002: A new genus and two new species of Arctiinae, Arctiidae: Lepidoptera, from India. Journal of the Bombay Natural History Society 99 (1): 79–85, Mumbai.

Spilosomina
Monotypic moth genera